WKYS (93.9 FM) is a commercial radio station licensed to Washington, D.C. The station is owned by Urban One through licensee Urban One Licenses, LLC, and broadcasts a mainstream urban radio format. It is co-owned with WMMJ, WOL, WPRS-FM, and WYCB, with studios and offices in Silver Spring, Maryland.

WKYS has an effective radiated power of 24,500 watts.  The transmitter tower is on Nebraska Avenue NW, co-located with the tower for WRC-TV (WKYS' former TV sister station).  WKYS broadcasts using HD Radio technology.  The urban talk programming of sister station WOL is heard on its HD3 digital subchannel.

History
The station was first launched as WRC-FM in June 1947 alongside its television partner, WRC-TV (originally as WNBW). Both were built from the ground up by NBC, which launched WRC (980 AM) 24 years earlier. It inherited the call sign from its AM radio partner based on RCA's ownership of the network. During its early days, it carried a jazz format. The transition from the beautiful music format into what is now WKYS occurred when NBC moved the Top 40 format that was on sister station WRC/980 to WKYS to make way for an all-news format on the AM station. For a short time in 1975, the two stations simulcast the Top 40 format.

Shortly after the simulcast was discontinued, the original AM Top 40 format continued for a short while on the FM station, but later, seeing the coming boom in disco music, WKYS adopted a highly successful disco format in the late 1970s and branded itself as WKYS, "Disco 93.9". DJs during the disco era included Donnie Simpson, Jack Harris, Stoney Richards, Joe Cipriano, Eddie Edwards, Barry "Reazar" Richards, Bill Bailey, Jeff Leonard, Chuck Davis, Candy Shannon and Max Kinkel.

The disco format eventually evolved into the present urban contemporary format as "93.9 Kiss FM" under the guidance of Donnie Simpson.

In the mid-1980s, WKYS gained competition from WMMJ and WPGC. While that caused a setback in its dominance, WKYS did not suffer a huge of a threat to its ratings and audience share even as it had to rank behind the competition, including WHUR-FM, which converted its jazz format to urban AC in 1993. (The D.C. radio market is one of the very few markets to have multiple urban stations on the FM dial for a long time.)

When NBC divested all of its radio properties in 1988, WKYS was sold to Albimar Communications. Some years later, amid financial difficulties, in 1995, the station was sold to Radio One. In the mid-1990s, WKYS was forced to drop the "Kiss FM" name and changed it to "93.9 WKYS" due to Clear Channel acquiring the rights to the branding itself and enforcing the trademark rights nationwide. However, WKYS reintroduced the "Kiss FM" name for a period of time years after with its over-the-air branding, though Clear Channel did not make further claims of legal action. WKYS, however, retired the "Kiss FM" moniker later on and simply called itself "93.9 WKYS".

Shows
From 1977 to 1993, WKYS was home to radio personality Donnie Simpson. The station was also once the flagship of the nationally syndicated Russ Parr Morning Show. In January 2016, Russ Parr moved to sister station WMMJ (to replace Tom Joyner) and was replaced on WKYS by "The Fam in the Morning".

From 1983 to 1990, Kevin "Slow Jammin" James hosted his "Slow Jam" radio show from 7 p.m. to midnight, on Saturdays and Sundays.

Former logo

See also
WIHT
WPGC-FM

References

External links

Urban One stations
KYS
Mainstream urban radio stations in the United States
Radio stations established in 1947
1947 establishments in Washington, D.C.